The Coimbatore Integrated Bus Terminus, commonly known as the CIBT, is the integrated bus terminus under construction in Podanur on  Chettipalayam 
 Road, Coimbatore, Tamil Nadu, India, to serve both intercity and intracity buses. Upon completion, it would be the largest bus station in the world with an area of

Background
The bus terminus was planned to reduce traffic congestion in the city by integrating the Gandhipuram Central Bus Terminus, Gandhipuram Thiruvalluvar Bus stand (For SETC), KSRTC Buses (Karnataka) and KSRTC Buses (Kerala), Ukkadam Bus Terminus, Singanallur Bus Terminus, Saibaba Colony Bus Terminus within a single campus. The terminus would come up at Chettipalayam Road at Vellalore at a site of 61.6 acres area.

Timeline
2014-The Coimbatore Integrated Bus Terminus project was announced by former Chief Minister J. Jayalalithaa.
2020-The foundation stone was laid on 22 February. The proposed terminus will be built at a cost of  168 crores. 
2020-The CMRL proposed to connect CIBT and Ukkadam Bus Terminus by the corridor-V of Coimbatore Metro

Inclusion of Battery-based buses in CIBT
In the project, special battery charging points and maintenance sheds for battery-based buses are included.

Facilities
The size of the land earmarked for the project is 61 acres. The proposed terminus will have the following facilities:
140 bus bays
33 town bus bays
112 idle parking bays
80 omni bus bays
Mother's room
Medical centre, 
Clinic,
Store room
Cloak room 
11 ATM's
71 shops
seven offices for transport corporations
20 ticket counters, 3 transport offices and 3 time offices
2 restaurants over 405 square meters
2 dormitories
3 commercial office spaces
The parking will have 110 four wheeler parking slots and 1200 two wheeler parking slots.
TNSTC Coimbatore, Tiruppur Head Office

Planning Phase-1
The phase 1 will include the construction of Mofussil, SETC and City bus terminals.

Planning Phase-2
The phase 2 will include the construction of Omni bus terminal.

Connections
The terminus is connected to all the major places within the city such as:

Town Hall - 4.2 km
Gandhipuram Central Bus Terminus - 12.8 km
Singanallur Bus Terminus - 11.1 km
Ukkadam Bus Terminus - 8.8 km
Coimbatore Junction - 10.1 km
Podanur Junction - 2.9 km 
Coimbatore International Airport - 15.6 km
TIDEL Park - 13.8 km 
Coimbatore North Junction - 14.2 km 
Peelamedu - 14.2 km 
Singanallur - 11.3 km 
Irugur Junction - 11.8 km

Metro
The proposal of the Coimbatore Metro Corridor-V has been proposed to connect Ukkadam Bus Terminus with CIBT via Podanur Junction.

See also
Gandhipuram Central Bus Terminus
Ukkadam Bus Terminus
Singanallur Bus Terminus
Saibaba Colony Bus Terminus
Gandhipuram Town Bus stand
Coimbatore Omni Bus Terminus
 Transport in Coimbatore

References

Bus stations in Coimbatore